Ramaiyengar Sridharan is a mathematician at Chennai Mathematical Institute, formerly at the Tata Institute of Fundamental Research (TIFR).

Early life
He was born in Cuddalore in 1935. He obtained his Ph.D. from Columbia under the guidance of Samuel Eilenberg with his thesis on filtered algebras and representations of Lie algebras in 1960.

Awards
Sridharan was awarded the Shanti Swarup Bhatnagar Prize for Science and Technology (SSB prize) in Mathematical Science in 1980.

Selected publications
 Filtered algebras and representations of Lie algebras, R Sridharan - Transactions of the American Mathematical Society, 1961 - jstor.org
 On the global dimension of some algebras, MP Murthy, R Sridharan - Mathematische Zeitschrift, 1963 - Springer

References

External links 
 
 R. Sridharan

1935 births
Living people
20th-century Indian mathematicians
Tamil scientists
Presidents of the Indian Mathematical Society
People from Cuddalore district
Scientists from Tamil Nadu
Recipients of the Shanti Swarup Bhatnagar Award in Mathematical Science